Condemned is a 1923 silent comedy film directed by Arthur Rosson and starring Mildred Davis and Carl Miller. It was an independent production.

Cast
 Mildred Davis as The Girl
 Carl Miller as The Man

References

Bibliography
 Robert B. Connelly. The Silents: Silent Feature Films, 1910-36, Volume 40, Issue 2. December Press, 1998.

External links
 

1923 films
1923 comedy films
1920s English-language films
American silent feature films
Silent American comedy films
American black-and-white films
Films directed by Arthur Rosson
1920s American films